Evolution is a 2001 documentary series by the American broadcaster Public Broadcasting Service (PBS) and WGBH on evolutionary biology, from the producers of NOVA.

Overview
The spokespeople for the series were Jane Goodall (overall spokesperson), Kenneth R. Miller and Stephen Jay Gould (science spokespeople), Eugenie C. Scott (education spokesperson), Arthur Peacocke and Arnold Thomas (religious spokespeople).  The series was narrated by the Irish actor Liam Neeson.

The series was accompanied by a book by the popular science writer Carl Zimmer Evolution: The Triumph of an Idea.  An extensive website provides teaching resources for each episode's material, including "The Mating Game", further looks at Charles Darwin, and an interactive history of speciation in the invented "pollencreeper" birds.

The episode "What about God?" features discussion of the issues of evolution and creationism at Wheaton College, an Evangelical Protestant college that teaches evolution but has in the past restricted professors from taking a stance on the literal versus the allegorical interpretations of Adam and Eve in the Genesis account of creation.

Cast

Guest appearances 
Susan Blackmore
Sean B. Carroll
Jenny Clack
Richard Dawkins
Daniel Dennett
Robin Dunbar
Stephen Jay Gould
William McGinnis
James Moore
Simon Conway Morris
Walter Gehring
Steve Pinker
Geoffrey Miller
Neil Shubin
E. O. Wilson
Richard Wrangham

Episodes
 "Darwin's Dangerous Idea" (two hours)
 "Great Transformations" (one hour): the episode refers of the discovery that whales evolved from wolf-like carnivores, and of the publication of a related paper on Science.
 "Extinction!" (one hour)
 "The Evolutionary Arms Race" (one hour)
 "Why Sex?" (one hour)
 "The Mind's Big Bang" (one hour - covering the topics of how the human mind was born, art, language and memes in general)
 "What About God?" (one hour)

Reception
TV critic Julie Salamon, writing in The New York Times, said that "[a] powerful sense of drama, discovery and intellectual enthusiasm runs through this rich eight-hour series ... The series covers an enormous amount of ground but doesn't leave you feeling swamped."

Being made and broadcast in the country where creation–evolution controversy is strongest, the last episode What About God? focused on religion, and "through personal stories of students and teachers, it offers the view that they are compatible".  Phina Borgeson, Faith Network Director of the National Center for Science Education, provided a Congregational Study Guide for Evolution.  Conversely, the Discovery Institute's Center for the Renewal of Science and Culture produced a website to refute the documentary and started a petition it called A Scientific Dissent From Darwinism to show that there were "scientists that dispute the claims".

References

External links
 
 Resources for PBS Evolution from the National Center for Science Education
 

PBS original programming
Television series by WGBH
2001 American television series debuts
2001 American television series endings
Biological evolution
Jane Goodall
Documentary television shows about evolution